Smyk may refer to:

Smyk (brand), Polish chain store with products for children
PW-5, the Smyk, a Polish sailplane designed at the Politechnika Warszawska
MIP Smyk, Polish  motor glider
 Smyk (car), Polish prototype microcar
Smyk, a pseudonym of Władysław Ossowski
Smyk (surname)
"Smyk" Department Store, department store building in Warsaw, Poland